Mario Rivera Martinó  (April 20, 1924 – September 13, 2017) was a journalist, sports writer and President of the Puerto Rico Boxing Commission. In 2006, he was inducted into the Puerto Rican Sports Hall of Fame. In December 2018, the International Boxing Hall of Fame announced that Rivera Martinó would be inducted into their hall of fame during  their 30th annual induction ceremonies which were held from June 6 to 9, 2019 in Canastota, New York.

Early years
Rivera Martinó was one of nine siblings born to Nicolás Rivera Muñiz and María Luisa Martino Muler in the town of Toa Alta, Puerto Rico. In 1930, when he was six years old, his family moved to New York City. There he received his primary and secondary education. He helped his family economically by shining shoes.

According to Rivera Martinó, on one occasion in 1935, Puerto Rican boxer Pedro Montañez came up him with scuffed shoes. Montañez was recognized by Ring Magazine as one of history's most prolific knockout winners with 56 knockout wins, and one of the Latinos with the most knockout wins—while only being knocked out twice himself. He also ranks as number 14 in boxing history, also recognized by Ring Magazine, among boxers with most wins in a row, totalling 88 wins in a row. Rivera Martinó did not hesitate and shined Montañez's shoes. He was quoted as saying the following:  

Rivera Martinó joined the United States Army in 1942, during World War II. The Ring, an American boxing magazine, gave him the assignment of covering Joe Louis’s tour of Army camps. The Army had placed Louis in its Special Services Division rather than sending him into combat. Louis went on a celebrity tour with other notables, including fellow boxer Sugar Ray Robinson. Rivera Martinó served actively in the Army as a reporter until 1944.

Career
Rivera Martinó returned to New York City and in 1945, he filed his first report with The Ring. He moved to Puerto Rico in 1948 and continued to write for The Ring, being their Puerto Rico correspondent for the next 50 years. He wrote both in English and Spanish thus, turning boxing around with his Hispanic touch. He is the first professional chronicler of the Caribbean who was dramatically inserted in international boxing. Rivera Martinó also had a boxing sports column in The San Juan Star, a local Puerto Rican newspaper. In 1950, he wrote his first ringside report for the magazine.

Among the Puerto Rican boxers which he covered on the ringside were Jose "Chegüi" Torres, Carlos Ortiz, Esteban de Jesús, Edwin "El Chapo" Rosario, Wilfredo "Bazooka" Gomez and Félix "Tito" Trinidad. His list of the 10 greatest Puerto Rican-born fighters of all-time are the following:

 Wilfredo "Bazooka" Gomez (44–3–1, 42 KOs)
 Carlos Ortiz (61–7–1, 30 KOs)
 Felix "Tito" Trinidad (42–3, 35 KOs)
 Edwin "El Chapo" Rosario (47–6, 41 KOs)
 Miguel Cotto (41–6, 33 KOs)
 Esteban de Jesus (58–5, 33 KOs)
 Sixto Escobar (43–22–3, 19 KOs)
 Pedro Montanez (92–7–4, 54 KOs)
 Jose "Chegüi" Torres (41–3–1, 29 KOs)
 Alfredo Escalera (53–14–3, 31 KOs)

Rivera Martinó was appointed boxing commissioner of Puerto Rico in 1991 and in 1992 was appointed president of the Puerto Rico Boxing Commission. From 1996 to 2010, he served as the public relations officer of the World Boxing Organization.

In 2006, Rivera Martinó was inducted into the Hall of Fame of Puerto Rican Sports. He donated much of his boxing collection to that institution, including his entire collection of The Ring editions since 1948.

Later years

On February 4, 2009,  Rivera Martinó incorporated the "MARIO RIVERA MARTINÓ FOUNDATION Inc." whose mission is to provide educational methods, such as tutorials, materials, fees, professional and amateur boxer exams to promote education and combat social problems.

Rivera Martinó moved to Orlando, Florida. He had a weak heart and was suffering from health issues. Apparently his health situation became complicated when he came down with pneumonia and was therefore, hospitalized. Rivera Martinó was unable to recuperate his health and on September 13, 2017, he died. His funeral was held at the Funeraria San Juan which is located at 3189 South John Young PKWY in Kissimmee, Florida. He was 93 years old. He was buried at the Florida National Cemetery in Bushnell, Florida.
 
Rivera Martinó was posthumously nominated to be enshrined into the International Boxing Hall of Fame in 2019. He will be officially inducted during the International Boxing Hall of Fame weekend ceremonies in June, 2019.

Note

See also

 List of Puerto Ricans
 Sports in Puerto Rico

References

1924 births
2017 deaths
United States Army personnel of World War II
Burials at Florida National Cemetery
Puerto Rican Army personnel
Puerto Rican journalists
United States Army soldiers
International Boxing Hall of Fame inductees
People from Toa Alta, Puerto Rico
Shoeshiners